Ocros District may refer to:

 Ocros District, Ocros
 Ocros District, Huamanga